Sarah Martin (1791–1843) was a British philanthropist.

Sarah or Sara Martin may also refer to:

Sara Martin (1884–1955), American blues singer
Sarah Martin (musician) (born 1974), British musician

See also
Sara Martins (born 1977), Portuguese-born French actress